Poitín is a Celtic band from the Czech Republic. Founded in 1996, they have been active since 1997 and their music includes traditional Irish music, Scottish music, English folk songs and original compositions in the Celtic genre. Their most recent album is One For The Road(December 2022). This was preceded by Simple Pleasures, released September 2016, and Wish which was released in March 2014. The 2010 CD Bofiguifluki, was the first recording by a Czech band to be voted Celtic Album of the year 2010 by Celtic Radio.Net. They were one of the first Celtic music groups to form in the Czech Republic after the Velvet Revolution and have had a significant influence on the development of the Celtic musical scene in that country.

Band members 
 Jeremy King (lead vocals, bodhran, spoons)
 Jaroslav 'Oto' Macháček (fiddle)
 Kuba Siegl (guitar)
 Sasha Marešová (whistle)
 Ivan Kudrna (double bass)

Discography 
 Poitín (album) (2000)
 De la Basse Bretagne (album) (2003)
 Hot Days (album) (2006)
 Jiggery Pokery (album) (2009) (compilation)
 Bofiguifluki (album) (2010)
 Wish (album) (2014)
 Simple Pleasures (album) (2016)
 Keltské balady (compilation album, various artists) (2018)
 One For The Road (album) (2022)

Interviews 
 Český Rozhlas interview with Jaroslav 'Oto' Macháček and Jakub Siegl on the band's 20 years together. September 2016 (in Czech)
 Český Rozhlas interview with Jeremy King. September 2012 (in Czech)
 Celtic Music Magazine with the band
 The Celtic Music Fan interview with Jeremy King

References

External links 
 Poitín Bandcamp page
 Poitín FaceBook page
 Poitín Reverbnation page
 Poitín official website

Celtic fusion groups
Czech folk music groups
1996 establishments in the Czech Republic
Musical groups established in 1996